Coffeetime Crosswords is a crossword puzzle game developed by Japanese studio Voltex, Inc. for Xbox Live Arcade on the Xbox 360 released on July 16, 2008.

Reception

Coffeetime Crosswords received negative reviews from critics upon release. On Metacritic, the game holds a score of 39/100 based on 8 reviews, indicating "generally unfavorable reviews."

References 

2008 video games
Puzzle video games
Video games developed in Japan
Xbox 360 Live Arcade games
Xbox 360-only games
Xbox 360 games